The Operation Arsenal, code name: "Meksyk II" was the first major operation by the Gray Ranks, Polish Underground formation during the Nazi German occupation of Poland. It took place on March 26, 1943 in Warsaw. Its name was coined after the Warsaw Arsenal, in front of which the action took place. The plan was to free the troop leader Jan Bytnar "Rudy", who was arrested together with his father by the Gestapo. The operation was executed by 28 scouts led by Warsaw Standard Commander Stanisław Broniewski "Orsza". The initiator and the commander of the "Attack Group" was Tadeusz Zawadzki "Zośka".

The successfully conducted operation led to the release of Jan Bytnar and 24 other prisoners, including another Storm Group troop leader, Henryk Ostrowski "Henryk", and 6 women, in an attack on the prison van that was taking the inmates from Pawiak Prison to Gestapo Headquarters at Szucha Avenue. Bytnar himself died four days later on account of injuries sustained due to German torture. Both of his interrogators, identified as Hubert Schulz and Ewald Lange, were assassinated by Szare Szeregi within two months.

The Operation was presented in a 1978 Polish film Akcja pod Arsenałem and in a 2014 Polish film Stones for the Rampart based on Aleksander Kamiński's novel of the same name.

Details

See also
German occupation of Poland
Warsaw Uprising

  Meksyk II

References

Further reading
Tomasz Strzembosz: Odbijanie więźniów w Warszawie 1939–1944. Warszawa: Państwowe Wydawnictwo Naukowe, 1972, s. 114

1943 in Poland
History of Warsaw
Arsenal
General Government